George Speake,  is an English art historian and archaeologist. He is an Honorary Research Fellow at the Institute of Archaeology at Oxford, and "a leading authority on Anglo-Saxon animal art." Currently Speake is the Anglo-Saxon Art and Iconography Specialist for the Staffordshire Hoard conservation team, and is working on the reconstruction of the Staffordshire helmet.

Early life and education
George Speake was educated at the Slade School of Fine Art in the 1960s, and the University of Oxford, where he studied at St John's College and at the Institute of Archaeology, in the 1970s. At Oxford he studied under Christopher and Sonia Hawkes, obtaining a Ph.D. in 1974 with a thesis about Anglo-Saxon animal art.

Career

Speake specialises in Anglo-Saxon art and iconography. As of 2016 he is working on the reconstruction of the more than 1,000 pieces of the Staffordshire helmet, following work on the Prittlewell burial, and teaching fine art and art history. In 2014 he coauthored a book on the Staffordshire Hoard, Beasts, Birds and Gods: Interpreting the Staffordshire Hoard, identifying among other characteristics an "eyeless, open-jawed serpent" depicted on the helmet's cheek guard. A paper on the helmet is due to be published in 2018. He is also an Honorary Research Fellow at the Institute of Archaeology at Oxford.

Speake's 1980 work Anglo-Saxon Animal Art and its Germanic Background, written as the basis for his Ph.D., is considered "a major break-through in Anglo-Saxon style studies". It provided a comprehensive look at "style II" art, the form of zoomorphic decoration used in Northern Europe from the middle of the sixth century AD to the end of the seventh. Hitherto the least understood style of Anglo-Saxon and Scandinavian animal art, style II is thought to have been reserved for the upper classes and is found prominently on the objects found in the Sutton Hoo ship-burial and in the Vendel boat graves. Speake's work was credited with discussing every known example of the style through 1974—the date of his Ph.D.—and with proving that it was introduced to England from Denmark, Norway, and Sweden.

Publications
  
  
 
  
 
 
 
 
 
 Speake, George. Aspects of the Staffordshire Hoard Helmet (forthcoming).

References

Bibliography
 
  
  
  
  
  
  
  
  
  

Year of birth missing (living people)
Living people
Germanic studies scholars
English archaeologists
English art historians
Fellows of the Society of Antiquaries of London
Alumni of the University of Oxford
Anglo-Saxon studies scholars